The 2015–16 Ranji Trophy was the 82nd season of the Ranji Trophy, the premier first-class cricket tournament in India. It was contested by 27 teams divided into three groups of nine teams each. The top three teams from Groups A and B advanced to the quarterfinals along with the top two teams from Group C. For this season the schedule splits into two stages,  the first is a league stage and the second being a  knock-out stage. The league stage starts on  1 October 2015 and ends on 4 December 2015 and the knock-out stage starts on 3 February 2016 and ends on 28 February 2016. The 2015–16 Ranji Trophy will be followed by the Vijay Hazare Trophy, Syed Mushtaq Ali Trophy and Deodhar Trophy.

The final was contested by Saurashtra and Mumbai, a repeat of the 2012–13 final. Mumbai won the match by an innings and 21 runs to claim their 41st title.

Personnel changes

Players

Coaches

Teams
The groups drawn are as follows

Group A
 Assam
 Bengal
 Delhi
 Haryana
 Karnataka
 Maharashtra
 Odisha
 Rajasthan
 Vidarbha

Group B
 Andhra Pradesh
 Baroda
 Gujarat
 Madhya Pradesh
 Mumbai
 Punjab
 Railways
 Tamil Nadu
 Uttar Pradesh

Group C
 Goa
 Himachal Pradesh
 Hyderabad
 Jammu & Kashmir
 Jharkhand
 Kerala
 Saurashtra
 Services
 Tripura

Group A

Points table

Group B

Points table

Group C

Points table

Knockout stage

Quarter-finals
1st Quarter-final

2nd Quarter-final

3rd Quarter-final

4th Quarter-final

Semi-finals
1st Semi-final

2nd Semi-final

Final

Statistics

Batting records

Most runs

High scores

Most hundreds

Most fifties (and over)

Most sixes in an innings

References

External links
 Series home at ESPNCricinfo
 Series home at Bcci.tv

Ranji Trophy seasons
Ranji Trophy Trophy
Ranji Trophy
Ranji Trophy